Rannu is a small borough in Tartu County, Estonia.

Gallery

References

External links
Rannu Parish 

Boroughs and small boroughs in Estonia
Kreis Dorpat